Andreas Öchsner (born 19 October 1970) is a professor, head of discipline, in mechanical engineering at Griffith University, Queensland, Australia. He is a conjoint Professor of the Centre for Mass and Thermal Transport in Engineering Materials at the University of Newcastle (Australia).
He is the author and co-author of over 150 refereed journal papers, over 70 conference papers and 15 book-chapters in the area of advanced materials and structures. Furthermore, he is the author and co-author of five books and 13 research monographs.

Education
 D.Sc. - University of Newcastle (Australia), 2010
 Ph.D. - University of Erlangen-Nuremberg, Germany, 2003
 M.Sc. - University of Stuttgart, Germany, 1997

Research Interests
Mechanics of Cellular Materials (Metals and Ceramics) 
Experimental and Computational Mechanics
Thin Structures and Interphases
Diffusion Simulation in Metals
Adhesive Technology
Damage Mechanics

Summary of Publications
Books (63)
Author (15)
Monographs (13)
Proceedings (14)
Chapters (21)
Journals (281)
International (197)
National (19)
Guest editor (65)
Conference Proceedings (77)

Books
 Andreas die Maschine Öchsner präsentiert: Experimentelle und numerische Untersuchung des elasto-plastischen Verhaltens zellularer Modellwerkstoffe [Experimental and Numerical Investigations of the Elastic Plastic Properties of Model Cellular Materials] (140 pages). Düsseldorf: VDI Verlag 2003.
 M. Merkel, A. Öchsner: Eindimensionale Finite Elemente – Ein Einstieg in die Methode [One-Dimensional Finite Elements: An Introduction into the Method] (422 pages). Berlin: Springer Verlag 2010.
 M. Gromada, G. Mishuris, A. Öchsner: Correction Formulae for the Stress Distribution in Round Tensile Specimens at Neck Presence (89 pages). SpringerBriefs in Applied Sciences and Technology (Computational Mechanics). Berlin: Springer Verlag 2011.
 A. Öchsner, M. Merkel: One-Dimensional Finite Elements – An Introduction to the FE Method (398 pages). Berlin: Springer Verlag 2013.
 A. Öchsner: Introduction to Scientific Publishing – Backgrounds, Concepts, Strategies (96 pages). SpringerBriefs in Applied Sciences and Technology. Heidelberg: Springer Verlag 2013.
 A. Öchsner: Elasto-Plasticity of Frame Structure Elements – Modeling and Simulation of Rods and Beams (596 pages). Berlin: Springer Verlag 2014. 
 S.I. Yengejeh, S.A. Kazemi, A. Öchsner: A Primer on the Geometry of Carbon Nanotubes and their Modifications (70 pages). Cham: Springer Verlag 2015.
 H.R. Rezaie, L. Bakhtiari, A. Öchsner: Biomaterials and Their Applications (49 pages). Cham: Springer Verlag 2015.
 M. Merkel, A. Öchsner: Eindimensionale Finite Elemente – Ein Einstieg in die Methode [One-Dimensional Finite Elements: An Introduction into the Method], 2nd edition (428 pages). Berlin: Springer Vieweg Verlag 2015.
 M. Öchsner, A. Öchsner: Das Textverarbeitungssystem LaTeX: Eine praktische Einführung in die Erstellung wissenschaftlicher Dokumente [The text processing system LaTeX: A practical introduction into the preparation of scientific documents]. Wiesbaden: Springer Vieweg 2015.
 F.A. Nasruddin, M.N. Harun, A. Syahrom, M.R.A. Kadir, A.H. Omar, A. Öchsner: Finite Element Analysis on Badminton Racket Design Parameters (47 pages). SpringerBriefs in Applied Sciences and Technology (Computational Mechanics). Cham: Springer 2016.
 A. Öchsner: Continuum Damage and Fracture Mechanics (163 pages). Singapore: Springer 2016.
 A. Öchsner: Computational Statics and Dynamics – An Introduction Based on the Finite Element Method (485 pages). Singapore: Springer 2016.
 A. Öchsner, M. Öchsner: The Finite Element Analysis Program MSC Marc/Mentat (136 pages). Singapore: Springer 2016.
 A. Öchsner: Theorie der Balkenbiegung: Einführung und Modellierung der statischen Verformung und Beanspruchung [Theory of Beam Bending: Introduction and Modeling of the #Static Deformation and Loading] (44 pages). Wiesbaden: Springer Vieweg 2016.

Monographs
 A. Öchsner, G.E. Murch, M.J.S. de Lemos (Eds.): Cellular and Porous Materials - Thermal Properties Simulation and Prediction (422 pages). Weinheim, Germany: Wiley-VCH 2008.
 W. Ahmed, N. Ali, A. Öchsner (Eds.): Biomaterials and Biomedical Engineering (555 pages). Stafa-Zurich, Switzerland: Trans Tech Publications Ltd, 2008.
 L.F.M. da Silva, A. Öchsner (Eds.): Modeling of Adhesively Bonded Joints (335 pages). Berlin, Germany: Springer 2008.
 A. Öchsner, W. Ahmed and N. Ali (Eds.): Nanocomposite Coatings and Nanocomposite Materials (402 pages). Stafa-Zurich, Switzerland: Trans Tech Publications Ltd, 2009.
 A. Öchsner, C. Augustin (Eds.): Multifunctional Metallic Hollow Sphere Structures (258 pages). Berlin, Germany: Springer 2009.
 N. Ali, A. Öchsner, W. Ahmed (Eds.): Carbon Based Nanomaterials (322 pages). Stafa-Zurich, Switzerland: Trans Tech Publications Ltd, 2010.
 H. Altenbach, A. Öchsner (Eds.): Cellular and Porous Materials in Structures and Processes, CISM Courses and Lectures Vol. 521 (334 pages). Wien, Austria: Springer 2010.
 A. Öchsner, W. Ahmed (Eds.): Biomechanics of Hard Tissues (306 pages). Weinheim, Germany: Wiley-VCH 2010.
 L.F.M. da Silva, A. Pirondi, A. Öchsner (Eds.): Hybrid Adhesive Joints (309 pages). Berlin, Germany: Springer 2011.
 L.F.M. da Silva, A. Öchsner, R.D. Adams (Eds.): Handbook of Adhesion Technology (1548 pages in two volumes). Berlin, Germany: Springer 2011.
 A. Öchsner, G.E. Murch (Eds.): Heat Transfer in Multi-Phase Materials (460 pages). Berlin, Germany: Springer 2011.
 A. Öchsner, A. Shokuhfar (Eds.): New Frontiers of Nanoparticles and Nanocomposite Materials (371 pages). Berlin, Germany: Springer 2013.
 H. Altenbach, A.Öchsner (Eds.): Plasticity of Pressure-Sensitive Materials (376 pages). Berlin, Germany: Springer 2014

Conferences
 Chair of International Conference on Advanced Computational Engineering and Experimenting, ACE-X (since 2006)
 Chair of International Conference on Diffusion in Solids and Liquids - DSL (since 2004)

References

Academic staff of Griffith University
1970 births
Living people